Wrightstown is an unincorporated community in Wrightstown Township in Bucks County, Pennsylvania, United States. Wrightstown is located at the intersection of Pennsylvania Route 413 and Worthington Mill Road/Wrightstown Road.

References

Unincorporated communities in Bucks County, Pennsylvania
Unincorporated communities in Pennsylvania